The 2013 Pro Bowl was the National Football League (NFL)'s sixty-third annual all-star game which featured players from the 2012 season. It took place at 2:30 pm Hawaii–Aleutian Time (UTC−10:00; 7:30 pm Eastern Time) on Sunday, January 27, 2013 at the Aloha Stadium in Honolulu, Hawaii. The game was televised nationally by NBC in place of CBS. The game was delayed for 30 minutes due to flash flood warnings.

John Fox of the AFC West Denver Broncos led the AFC "home team" against a "visiting" NFC team that was coached by the Green Bay Packers head coach Mike McCarthy of the NFC North. These coaches were selected for coaching the highest seeded team to lose in the Divisional Round of the playoffs, which has been the convention since the 2009 Pro Bowl. Ed Hochuli was the game referee.

Players on the winning team (NFC) each earned $50,000, while players on the losing team (AFC) earned $25,000.

The Houston Texans and San Francisco 49ers had the most Pro Bowl selections with nine.  The Kansas City Chiefs, despite only winning two games, had six selections. Six teams, the Carolina Panthers, Philadelphia Eagles, St. Louis Rams, Tennessee Titans, Jacksonville Jaguars, and San Diego Chargers, had no selections. Three rookie quarterbacks (Andrew Luck, Robert Griffin III, and Russell Wilson) were selected, which is the most in Pro Bowl history.

As of 2023, this remains the most recent the NFC defeated the AFC in a Pro Bowl game.

Summary

Scoring summary  
The scores broken down by quarter:

AFC rosters

The following players were selected to represent the AFC:

Offense

Defense

Special teams

NFC rosters
The following players were selected to represent the NFC:

Offense

Defense

Special teams

Indicating he would retire after the Pro Bowl, NFC center Jeff Saturday treated the game as a testimonial match and crossed over to the AFC side for one play in order to reunite with quarterback Peyton Manning; the two had played together as members of the Indianapolis Colts for thirteen seasons.

Notes:
bold player who participated in game
Replacement selection due to injury or vacancy
Injured player; selected but will not play
Replacement starter; selected as reserve
Selected but did not play because his team advanced to Super Bowl XLVII (see Pro Bowl "Player Selection" section)
Ryan Clark was the first alternate, but declined due to injury
Jimmy Graham was the first alternate, but declined due to injury

Number of selections per team

Broadcasting
The game was televised nationally by NBC after Super Bowl XLVII broadcaster CBS declined to exercise their right to air the game, even though that network was using the game as part of the plot of an episode of Hawaii Five-0 to be aired three weeks later. This was the second of three consecutive years that NBC carried the game, since CBS also decided not to broadcast the 2013 Pro Bowl and Fox would later decline to carry the 2014 game.

References

External links

Game box score

Pro Bowl
Pro Bowl
Pro Bowl
Pro Bowl
Pro Bowl
American football competitions in Honolulu
Pro Bowl
2013 in sports